Zippos Mr Good Bar (1984–2016) is a registered American Quarter Horse with the American Quarter Horse Association (AQHA). He is an American Quarter Horse Hall of Fame inductee for 2019. He is known for his show career and as a top sire. He was 32 years of age in 2016 when he died.

Life

Zippos Mr Good Bar is a 1984 Roan son of Zippo Pine Bar out of Tamara Wess, a daughter of Blondy's Dude. Breeder Norman Reynolds of Lexington, Nebraska, was responsible for pairing his stallion, Zippo Pine Bar, to Tamara Wess. He was at the Saul Family Farm in Arkansas where he was given the barn name "Roan Boy". The color roan was not desired when he competed in Western Pleasure, but through competition and winning, he and his progeny changed that.

Show career 
The stallion earned close to $39,000 in the show ring. It was during his show career that the stallion caught the eye of the Narmonts of Auburn, Illinois. First they leased him, then became partners on him, and finally bought him in 1998.

Breeding record 
Zippos Mr Good Bar sired winners in all AQHA show disciplines. He sired 89 point-earners. These have earned $3.3 million along with 67,477 points, 22 world championships and 17 reserve world championships. His progeny have also earned points in the Palomino Horse Breeders of America and the International Buckskin Horse Association. He also excelled as a broodmare sire. His grandget earned $3.2 million, 72, 758 points, and 303 Superiors.

He was used to breed performance horses in which he produced 1,641 registered foals with at least 936 of them competing. He has 24 national level wins on top of All American Quarter Horse Congress wins. His progeny have nearly $950,000 in AQHA Incentive Fund earnings as well as over $1.6 million in NSBA futurity earnings. His most well-known progeny is daughter American Quarter Horse Hall of Fame member Vital Signs Are Good.

Death and honors 
He was inducted into the AQHA Hall of Fame in 1999. He was inducted into the National Snaffle Bit Association Hall of Fame in 2000. Zippos Mr Good Bar died July 22, 2016, at the age of 32 at Richland Ranch in Auburn, Illinois.

Pedigree

Notes

References
 All Breed Pedigree Database Pedigree of Zippos Mr Good Bar accessed May 9, 2019
 Zippos Mr Good Bar accessed May 9, 2019
 AQHA Hall of Fame accessed May 9, 2019
 NSBA Hall of Fame accessed on May 9, 2019

External links 
 Zippos Mr Good Bar by  Richland Ranch

1984 animal births
2016 animal deaths
American Quarter Horse show horses
American Quarter Horse sires
AQHA Hall of Fame (horses)